Ahnger is a surname. Notable people with this name include:

Alexandra Ahnger (1859-1940), Finnish opera singer and instructor
Arthur Ahnger (1886—1940), Finnish sailor
Constantin Ahnger (1855-1942), Finnish engineer and scientist

Finnish-language surnames